Theodore Foster (April 29, 1752January 13, 1828) was an American lawyer and politician from Rhode Island. He was a member of the Federalist Party and later the National Republican Party.  He served as one of the first two United States senators from Rhode Island and, following John Langdon, served as dean of the Senate.

Early life

Foster was born in Brookfield, Massachusetts in 1752. He engaged in classical studies at the College in the English Colony of Rhode Island and Providence Plantations (now known as Brown University), graduating in 1770.  He then studied law and lived with fellow student Solomon Drowne.  He was admitted to the bar association in 1771 and remained in Rhode Island to practice law, beginning his law practice in Providence. He was town clerk in Providence from 1775–1787. He earned his master's degree from Dartmouth College in 1786.

Foster was a protege of Brown University's first chancellor, Chief Justice of Rhode Island and Providence Plantations and revolutionary patriot Stephen Hopkins. Foster married the sister of the future governor of Rhode Island and Providence Plantations Arthur Fenner.

American Revolution
Foster played a role in the Gaspee Affair of 1772, along with John Brown and others, which helped catalyze events leading to up to the American Revolutionary War.  Foster distinguished himself as a staunch supporter of General George Washington and the Federalist cause.

Later life
Until 1790 Foster held various positions in the government of Rhode Island.  He was then elected to the United States Senate, beginning his service on June 12, 1790.  Rhode Island's state legislature re-elected him in 1791 and 1797, and he served until March 3, 1803, when he retired from public life to engage in writing and historical research. He was elected a member of the American Antiquarian Society in 1820. Foster became a passionate collector of numerous documents relating to colonial Providence.  He helped found the Rhode Island Historical Society in 1822. Foster's heirs sold his extensive collection of historical documents to the Society in 1833.  Many of these documents are unpublished.

During the latter period, Foster also served as a trustee of Brown University. Foster returned to public life to serve in the Rhode Island state legislature from 1812 to 1816.  He lived in the town of Foster, Rhode Island, which was named after him. When Solomon Drowne moved back to Rhode Island he lived on a farm (Mt. Hygeia) next to Foster's.

Foster died on January 13, 1828, and is interred in Swan Point Cemetery in Providence.

Family life
Foster's father was Massachusetts Supreme Judicial Court Justice Jedediah Foster,  who graduated from Harvard University in 1744.

Foster was the elder brother of Senator Dwight Foster of Massachusetts, and the great uncle of Massachusetts Attorney General and Massachusetts Supreme Judicial Court Justice Dwight Foster.

References

External links

 
 Theodore Foster's Minutes of the Convention Held at South Kingstown, Rhode Island, in March, 1790: Which Failed to Adopt the Constitution of the United States preview at Google books
 An article on his life from the Rhode Island Historical Society
 Theodore Foster in the Gaspee Affair

	

1752 births
1828 deaths
People from Brookfield, Massachusetts
People of colonial Massachusetts
People of colonial Rhode Island
American people of English descent
Pro-Administration Party United States senators from Rhode Island
Federalist Party United States senators from Rhode Island
Rhode Island National Republicans
Members of the Rhode Island House of Representatives
People from Foster, Rhode Island
18th-century American lawyers
Dartmouth College alumni
Brown University alumni
Members of the American Antiquarian Society
Political leaders of the American Revolution
Patriots in the American Revolution
People of Rhode Island in the American Revolution
Burials at Swan Point Cemetery